Điện Bàn is a district-level town of Quảng Nam Province in the South Central Coast region of Vietnam. As of 2015 the district had a population of 229,907. The district covers an area of 214.71 km². The district capital lies at Vĩnh Điện.

On March 11, 2015, Điện Bàn Town was established based of Điện Bàn District

References

Districts of Quảng Nam province
County-level towns in Vietnam